The men's tournament of basketball at the 2013 Summer Universiade in Kazan began on July 7 and end on July 16. Russia won the tournament after beating Australia in the final.

Teams

Preliminary round

Group A

|}

Group B

|}

Note: Philippines has been disqualified because of leaving the tournament before the quarterfinal round. All their matches have been cancelled and assigned defeats by 0–20.

Group C

|}

Group D

|}

Classification rounds

Quarterfinal round

17th–24th place

9th–16th place

Semifinal round

21st–24th place

17th–20th place

13th–16th place

9th–12th place

5th–8th place

Final round

23rd-place game

21st place game

19th-place game

17th-place game

15th-place game

13th-place game

11th-place game

9th-place game

7th-place game

5th-place game

Elimination round

Quarterfinals

Semifinals

Bronze-medal game

Gold-medal game

Final standings

References

Men's